KJ may refer to:

People
 KJ Apa (born 1997), New Zealand actor and singer known for his role as Archie Andrews on Riverdale

Khairy Jamaluddin@ KJ (born 1976),former Minister Health Malaysia and Member of Parliament Rembau

Other uses
 Kwanyama dialect (ISO 639-1 code alpha-2 kj), a standardized dialect of Oshiwambo
 Kilojoule (kJ), an International System of Units unit of energy equal to 1000 joules
 British Mediterranean Airways (IATA airline code KJ)
 Jeep Liberty, a car (model code KJ)
 Karaoke jockey, a disk jockey who specializes in running karaoke performances
 Kiryas Joel, New York, a village in Monroe, Orange County, New York, US
 Knight of the Order of Saint Joachim

See also
 Kayjay, Kentucky
 Killjoy (disambiguation)
 King James (disambiguation)